In the New York City Subway there are several types of transfer stations:

 A station complex is where two or more stations are connected with a passageway inside fare control. There are  stations of the New York City Subway when each station is counted separately.
 Station serving two or more lines. It may be a multi-level or adjacent-platform station and is considered to be one station as classified by the MTA. Typically each track in a station belongs to a certain line.
 Station serving two or more services. Different services may share tracks. These stations are not included in this article; see List of New York City Subway stations.

Transfers are not limited to enclosed passageways. The New York City Transit Authority (NYCTA), manager of the New York City Subway, also offers limited free transfers between subway lines that allow passengers to reenter the system's fare control. This was originally done through a paper ticketing system before it was replaced by the MetroCard. Now the only permanent MetroCard subway-to-subway transfers are between the Lexington Avenue/59th Street complex and the Lexington Avenue–63rd Street station in Manhattan and between the Junius Street and Livonia Avenue stations in Brooklyn. The contactless OMNY fare payment system installed in 2019-2020 supports the same free transfers as the MetroCard does.

Some paper transfers between specific subway stations and bus routes also existed prior to July 4, 1997, when the MetroCard allowed free system-wide subway–bus transfers with fewer restrictions. The Rockaway Parkway station on the BMT Canarsie Line offers a transfer to the B42 bus within the station's fare control, the only such transfer within the NYCTA.



Context

The system was created from the consolidation of three separate companies that merged in 1940: the Interborough Rapid Transit Company (IRT), the Brooklyn–Manhattan Transit Corporation (BMT), and the Independent Subway System (IND). The earliest transfer stations were between lines of the same system: either the IRT, BMT or IND. The earliest free connection between lines that remains in existence is at Grand Central–42nd Street between the IRT Flushing Line and the original IRT subway (now served by the IRT 42nd Street Shuttle), which opened on June 22, 1915. Some stations were constructed with passageways that connected different systems, such as the original IRT subway's (now IRT Lexington Avenue Line) Brooklyn Bridge station with the BMT Centre Street Loop Subway's (now BMT Nassau Street Line) Chambers Street station. On July 1, 1948, post-unification, many free transfers between the former systems were created coincident with the doubling of the fare from five to ten cents.

The most recently created station complex is the Jay Street–MetroTech complex in Brooklyn on the IND Culver Line, IND Fulton Street Line and BMT Fourth Avenue Line; opened on December 8, 2010. The Court Square complex in Queens, which opened in 1988 as a connection between the IND Queens Boulevard and IND Crosstown lines, was expanded by adding a passageway to the IRT Flushing Line on June 3, 2011. A free transfer from Broadway–Lafayette Street to the uptown platform of Bleecker Street opened on September 25, 2012. A transfer to the downtown platform has existed since May 19, 1957. A passageway between Cortlandt Street and World Trade Center opened on December 29, 2017, along with a connection to the World Trade Center Transportation Hub. A passageway between the Times Square and Bryant Park station complexes was built in 2021, along with a new platform at the shuttle station (both the platform and passageway are closed during late nights).

Manhattan

Lower Manhattan (14th Street and below)

Former transfers

When the elevated IRT Third Avenue Line closed from Chatham Square to South Ferry on December 22, 1950, a paper transfer was given to the M15 bus route. The Third Avenue Line was closed in Manhattan on May 12, 1955, removing this transfer.

When the new "H" system was implemented on August 1, 1918, the Public Service Commission was unprepared for the heavy traffic using the 42nd Street Shuttle. The shuttle was closed for rebuilding at the end of August 3, and a paper transfer was added between Rector Street on the IRT Broadway–Seventh Avenue Line and Wall Street on the IRT Lexington Avenue Line (the only one of the two lines to go to Brooklyn at that time). Shuttle service resumed on September 28, 1918, but the transfer remained, and was expanded to allow transfers from Wall Street on the Brooklyn Branch of the Broadway–Seventh Avenue Line, its temporary end. After the Brooklyn Branch was completed on April 15, 1919, the transfer was no longer needed.

There was never a free transfer between the IRT Broadway–Seventh Avenue Line (outer) and IRT Lexington Avenue Line (inner) platforms at South Ferry. However, by 1960, night and weekend Lexington Avenue Line service (5 and 6 trains) stopped at the outer platform. This unadvertised transfer existed until 1977, when Lexington Avenue Line trains stopped running to South Ferry.

Midtown and Upper Manhattan

Former transfers

A paper transfer at the Polo Grounds (155th Street), between the IND Concourse Line and Polo Grounds Shuttle, was created on June 12, 1940, immediately after the IRT Ninth Avenue Line was closed south of 155th Street. It, along with the new transfer at 161st Street–Yankee Stadium, allowed passengers who had taken the Ninth Avenue Line from the IRT Jerome Avenue Line in the Bronx to use the IND Concourse Line and IND Eighth Avenue Line. The Polo Grounds Shuttle and the transfer were discontinued on August 31, 1958.

The Bronx

Former transfers

The first portion of the IRT White Plains Road Line opened on November 26, 1904 as a branch from the elevated IRT Third Avenue Line north of 149th Street to 180th Street–Bronx Park in West Farms. It was connected into the original IRT subway on July 10, 1905, and Third Avenue service was ended. Transfers were given at 149th Street for passengers who wanted to change to Third Avenue, and transfers were added between the Manhattan-bound subway and the Third Avenue Line to the north on July 13 due to the "congestion and confusion" at that point. These transfers originally only applied to trains continuing in the same direction; by the 1920s, this transfer point had become very congested. A passageway inside fare control was opened on June 1, 1927 in the triangle bounded by 148th Street, Third Avenue, and Willis Avenue. The Third Avenue Line closed on April 28, 1973, ending the transfer.

The IRT Dyre Avenue Line opened on May 15, 1941. At first, it did not connect directly to the IRT White Plains Road Line, and a transfer passageway (used by the New York, Westchester and Boston Railway when the Dyre Avenue Line tracks were part of its operation) was placed inside fare control. A direct connection to the White Plains Road Line north of the station opened on May 6, 1957, and the old NYW&B station was closed.

Brooklyn

Former transfers

On October 30, 1954, a connection between the IND Brooklyn Line and the BMT Culver Line opened, and the Culver Line was transferred from BMT to IND control. Service through the new connection commenced, and the BMT Culver Shuttle was instituted between Ditmas Avenue and Ninth Avenue, making Ditmas Avenue an inter-division transfer station. When the BMT Culver Shuttle ceased on May 11, 1975, the station was left to be served by the IND Culver Line only.

On March 5, 1944, when the elevated BMT Myrtle Avenue Line was removed from the Brooklyn Bridge elevated tracks, and cut back from Park Row to Bridge–Jay Streets, a paper transfer was added at Bridge–Jay Streets to the Brooklyn Bridge trolley lines, specifically the Smith Street Line, DeKalb Avenue Line, and Seventh Avenue Line. Bridge trolleys were discontinued on March 6, 1950, and the transfer was replaced with one to the IND Sixth Avenue Line. Manhattan-bound passengers received a transfer when boarding the Myrtle Avenue Line west of Broadway, but Brooklyn-bound passengers could only get one when entering at Broadway – Nassau Street, near Park Row. In addition, similar trolley transfers were provided at High Street – Brooklyn Bridge, at the Brooklyn end of the bridge. The Myrtle Avenue Line west of Broadway closed on October 3, 1969, and the transfer was replaced with one to the B54 bus route, which ran under the line. The transfers at High Street – Brooklyn Bridge were discontinued at some point, but the B54 transfer remained for a long time.

When the Broadway Elevated spur to Broadway Ferry closed to passengers on July 2, 1916, a paper transfer was added to the Broadway Ferry Shuttle streetcar line. The shuttle was moved from Broadway Ferry to Lorimer Street when the BMT Canarsie Line opened through Williamsburg on June 30, 1924, and Broadway Line streetcars were rerouted to the ferry. Later the transfer was to the Meeker Avenue Line, now part of the B24 bus route.

A paper transfer was added at Rockaway Avenue between the temporary east end of the underground IND Fulton Street Line and the new west end of the elevated BMT Fulton Street Line, immediately after the BMT Fulton Street Line was closed west of Rockaway Avenue on June 1, 1940. When the BMT Fulton Street Line was closed east of Rockaway Avenue on April 27, 1956, these transfers were discontinued.

The lower level, serving the Jamaica Line, opened in 1888. The station became a transfer station when the Myrtle Avenue Elevated platform on the upper level opened in 1889. When Myrtle Avenue Line service west of this station ended in 1969, the upper level was abandoned and all Myrtle Avenue Line trains from the east merged onto the Jamaica Line tracks.

Queens

See also

References

 
New York City Subway transfers
Sub
New York City-related lists